Albion Williamson Knight Jr. (1 June 1924 – 22 May 2012) was the second Archbishop of the United Episcopal Church of North America from 1989 until his resignation in 1992. As the Archbishop of the UECNA, Knight more than tripled the number of parishes belonging to the church. He later helped found the Church of England (Continuing), a conservative church in England that opposes both the growth of Anglo-Catholic practices and doctrines within the Church of England and the more liberal religious and social stance of the Church of England.

Knight was born in Jacksonville, Florida, the son of Albion Williamson Knight (1891-1953) and Anna Marion née Russell (1893-1966). He was the grandson of Albion W. Knight, formerly Bishop of Cuba in the Episcopal Church in the USA and subsequently Bishop Coadjutor of New Jersey. He graduated from the U.S. Military Academy in 1945, and retired from the Army in 1973 as a Brigadier General. He earned master's degrees from the University of Illinois and American University.

Knight was ordained a deacon in the Episcopal Church in the USA in 1964 and as a priest in that church in 1965. He joined the United Episcopal Church of North America in late 1983 and later became the bishop of its Eastern diocese (1984) before being elected its Archbishop (1985). He was consecrated in Bethesda, Maryland on 2 June 1984 by Charles D. D. Doren, the first bishop in the Continuing Anglican movement and first Archbishop of the UECNA.

During his tenure, Knight sponsored the creation of a denominational Seminary, reorganized the Church into Missionary Districts, and embarked on a revision of the Constitution and Canons which was initially voted on in 1991.  This changed the title of the senior bishop in the UECNA to Presiding Bishop.  However, he resigned in 1992 to pursue his political aspiration, and was succeeded as Presiding Bishop by John Cyrus Gramley (1931 to 1996).

In 1992, Knight was the vice-presidential candidate of the US Taxpayers Party in the U.S. presidential election.

Knight died on 22 May 2012, at his home in Gaithersburg, Maryland.

References

|-

1924 births
2012 deaths
20th-century American politicians
American Continuing Anglicans
Burials at Arlington National Cemetery
Maryland Constitutionalists
Constitution Party (United States) vice presidential nominees
Presiding Bishops of the United Episcopal Church of North America
1992 United States vice-presidential candidates